The third running of the Tour of Flanders for Women, a women's road cycling race in Belgium, was held on 2 April 2006. It was the third round of the 2006 UCI Women's Road World Cup. Dutch rider Mirjam Melchers-Van Poppel won her second consecutive Tour of Flanders in a two-up sprint with Austrian Christiane Soeder.

Race summary
159 riders started the race in Oudenaarde at 11:30. the peloton was thinned out on the wet and slick cobbled sector of the Paddestraat, after 24 km, after which only 50 riders remained at the front of the race. On the cobbled sector of the Haaghoek, after 69 km, Mirjam Melchers, Christiane Soeder, Edwige Pitel and Kimberly Anderson broke clear. Anderson was dropped 6 km later, on the Berendries climb, and the leading trio increased their lead to over a minute on the peloton as they addressed the Valkenberg, at 32 km from the finish. Melchers accelerated on the Valkenberg and dropped the other two, with Tenbosse, the Muur van Geraardsbergen and the Bosberg still to come.

Melchers crested the top of the Muur with a one-minute lead on Soeder, who left Pitel behind, but began to lose speed on the Bosberg. The Austrian set off in pursuit of Melchers and bridged across in Ninove, with two kilometres remaining. The race was decided in a two-up sprint in Meerbeke, with Melchers taking the honours before a worn-out Soeder. Dutchwoman Loes Gunnewijk broke clear from the chasing group and completed the podium at 53 seconds. Melchers would later say that she "experienced the race like a war".

Result

References

External links

2006
Tour
2006 UCI Women's Road World Cup